Abdal is an extinct town in Nuckolls County, in the U.S. state of Nebraska.

A post office was established at Abdal in 1893, and remained in operation until 1902. The name Abdal is derived from Arabic.

References

Ghost towns in Nebraska
Landforms of Nuckolls County, Nebraska